Stairs is an English surname. Notable people with the surname include:

 A. Edison Stairs (1924-2010), Canadian politician
 Denis Stairs (engineer) (1889–1980), Canadian engineer and businessman
 Denis Stairs (political scientist) (born 1939), Canadian science professor
 Ernest W. Stairs (1873–1941), Canadian politician
 Ingrid Stairs, Canadian astronomer
 Jess M. Stairs (born 1942), American politician 
 John Fitzwilliam Stairs (1848–1904), Canadian businessman and politician
 Matt Stairs (born 1968), Canadian baseball player
 William Grant Stairs (1863–1892), Canadian-British explorer, leader of the Stairs Expedition
 William J. Stairs (born 1956), Canadian politician
 William Machin Stairs (1789–1865), Canadian merchant, banker, statesman

See also 
 Steers (surname)

English-language surnames